Hywel Griffith is a Welsh television news correspondent with the BBC Wales.

Personal life
Griffith was born and raised in Wales. He read history at Bristol University, graduating in 1999, before taking a master's degree in medieval history at Queens' College, Cambridge, where he graduated in 2000. 

Griffith has the skin condition vitiligo.

Career
Griffith began his journalistic career as a graduate trainee with the BBC in 2000. He took a placement with the BBC Wales Cardiff newsroom as Wales Health Correspondent in 2005 before subsequently becoming Wales Correspondent in 2012 to cover new stories. In 2016, he was appointed BBC news correspondent for Australia and New Zealand at its base in Sydney before carrying out reporting assignments across Europe, the USA and the Caribbean. He returned to BBC Wales in 2019.

References

External links

Alumni of the University of Bristol
Alumni of Queens' College, Cambridge
Alumni of the University of Cambridge
BBC Cymru Wales newsreaders and journalists
BBC newsreaders and journalists
Living people
Welsh journalists
Year of birth missing (living people)